Patti Lank (born July 4, 1964) is an American curler from Lewiston, New York.

Career
Patti Lank began curling at the age of eleven and competed at her first US National Championships in 1994 and her team placed fourth. She has since gone on to compete in 21 National Championships.  Patti Lank has won the United States title five times (1997, 1999, 2002, 2004, and 2011) and competed in the World Championships held in those years.

In 1995 Lank earned a silver medal at the United States Mixed Curling Championship.

At her first world championships, held in Bern, Switzerland in 1997, she and her team placed sixth with a 4–5 record. She won the silver medal two years later at the 1999 World Championships, losing to Elisabet Gustafson's Swedish team in the final. That is her best finish at World's. Lank's team placed seventh at the 2002 World's and fourth in 2004.

Four times Lank has competed at the US Olympic Trials, in 1997, 2001, 2005, and 2009. Lank's team has finished in the top 4 every time, making it to the final in both 2001 and 2009, but fell short of earning the spot at the Olympics each time.

In 2011, Lank and her team of Caitlin Maroldo, Jessica Schultz, and Mackenzie Lank went through the 2011 US Nationals round robin with an 8–1 record. They won the championship by defeating Allison Pottinger in the final. They represented the US at the 2011 World Championship in Esbjerg, Denmark, where they finished seventh with a record of 6–5.

Lank made her first appearance at the World Senior Curling Championships in 2017 after winning the US Senior National title. Her team finished fourth, losing to Team Scotland in the bronze medal match 5–8.

In 2020 Lank returned to the United States National Championships, as skip for Christine McMakin's team, finishing tied for fourth place.

Teammates

1997 Berne World Championships

Patti Lank, Skip
Analissa Johnson, Third
Joni Cotten, Second
Tracy Sachtjen, Lead
Allison Pottinger, Alternate

1999 Saint John World Championships

Patti Lank, Skip
Erika Brown, Third
Allison Pottinger, Second
Tracy Sachtjen, Lead
Barb Perrella, Alternate

2004 Gävle World Championships

Patti Lank, Skip
Erika Brown, Third
Nicole Joraanstad, Second
Natalie Nicholson, Lead
Barb Perrella, Alternate

2011 Esbjerg World Championship

Patti Lank, Skip
Caitlin Maroldo, Third
Jessica Schultz, Second
Mackenzie Lank, Lead
Debbie McCormick, Alternate

Grand Slam record
Lank has not played in a Grand Slam event since the 2011 Curlers Corner Autumn Gold Curling Classic.

Former Events

References

External links

American female curlers
1964 births
Living people
Curlers from Saskatchewan
Canadian expatriate sportspeople in the United States
People from Lewiston, New York
American curling champions
Continental Cup of Curling participants
21st-century American women